Iyad Inomse M'Vourani Mohamed (born 5 March 2001) is a professional footballer who plays as a midfielder for  club Le Mans on loan from Caen. Born in France, he plays for the Comoros national team.

Club career
On 24 June 2022, Mohamed signed with Caen until 2025. On 2 January 2023, he was loaned by Le Mans.

International career
Born in France, Mohamed is of Comorian descent. He is a youth international, having represented the Comoros U20s in 2020. He made his international debut for the Comoros on 1 September 2021 during the 7-1 friendly win against the Seychelles, their biggest win ever.

References

External links
 
 
 Comoros Football profile
 AJA Profile

2001 births
Sportspeople from Dunkirk
Footballers from Hauts-de-France
French sportspeople of Comorian descent
Black French sportspeople
Living people
Comorian footballers
Comoros international footballers
Comoros under-20 international footballers
Association football midfielders
French footballers
AJ Auxerre players
Stade Malherbe Caen players
Le Mans FC players
Ligue 2 players
Championnat National 2 players
Championnat National 3 players
2021 Africa Cup of Nations players